Zhang Xiluan (1843–1922) was a Chinese general of the late Qing dynasty. Zhang joined the Hunan Army in 1864. He also served as the governor of Fengtian province beginning in 1913 and was the top military authority in Manchuria, appointed Governor General of all Manchurian Provinces by Yuan Shikai. He was also the rival of the politician and warlord Zhang Zuolin.

References 

1843 births
1922 deaths
Generals from Zhejiang
Politicians from Hangzhou
Qing dynasty generals
Republic of China politicians from Zhejiang
Empire of China (1915–1916)